Island council elections were held in the Netherlands Antilles on 29 April (ABC islands) and 6 May 1983 (SSS islands) to elect the members of the island councils of its six island territories. The election was won by the People's Electoral Movement (13 seats) in Aruba, the Bonaire Democratic Party (5 seats) in Bonaire, the New Antilles Movement (8 seats) in Curaçao, the Windward Islands People's Movement (4 seats) in Saba, the Democratic Party Statia (3 seats) in Sint Eustatius, and the Democratic Party (5 seats) in Sint Maarten.

Shooting of Betico Croes 
During the campaign in Aruba, an incident occurred at an illegally organized car parade of the People's Electoral Movement (MEP) in Santa Cruz on 24 April 1983. The rally was to be held on the same day as the car parade of the Aruban People's Party (AVP), but unlike the AVP, the MEP did not have permission from the local police. When MEP leader Betico Croes began mobilizing 500 cars for the parade, a warning shot was fired by a police officer. A second shot hit Croes in the abdomen.

Croes was taken to the Dr. Horacio E. Oduber Hospital in Oranjestad, where his spleen was removed and the bleeding was stopped. Directly after the shooting, riots occurred, in response to which Lieutenant Governor Pedro Bislip ordered to close all bars and prohibit the sale of alcohol on the island until further notice. Five days later, the MEP won the election with 57.9% of the popular vote.

Results

Aruba

Bonaire

Curaçao

Saba 
The result was a victory for the Windward Islands People's Movement, which won four of the five seats in the Island Council of Saba.

Sint Eustatius

Sint Maarten 
The Island Council seats increased from five to seven. The result was a victory for the Democratic Party, which won five of the seven Island Council seats.

References

1983 elections in the Caribbean
1983 in the Netherlands Antilles
April 1983 events in North America
May 1983 events in North America
Elections in the Netherlands Antilles
Elections in Aruba
Elections in Bonaire
Elections in Curaçao
Elections in Saba (island)
Elections in Sint Eustatius
Elections in Sint Maarten